Little King's Story is a real-time strategy life simulation role-playing video game co-developed by Cing and Town Factory for the Nintendo Wii. The game was published by Rising Star Games in Australia on April 22, 2009 and Europe on April 24, 2009, by Xseed Games in North America on July 21, 2009, and by Marvelous Entertainment in Japan on September 3, 2009.

The player character is a timid boy who has found a mysterious crown which gives him the power to charm people and make them follow orders. As king of the village his goal is to expand the village and make his subjects happy. The design of the game combines various simulation elements as well as real-time and adventure elements. Yasuhiro Wada told CVG that the game would be a "single-player life-sim set in Europe." An altered re-imagining of the game was released on the PlayStation Vita under the title of New Little King's Story to fulfil a licensing contract with Konami, although this version was later discontinued. A Microsoft Windows version of the original Wii game was released on August 5, 2016. This port was published by Xseed Games, the North American publisher for the original Wii release.

Gameplay

Building
In Little King's Story, player controls the new king, Corobo. With his undeniable charm and control, he issues various orders to citizens. Though starting in what is essentially a cluttered field, player begins to upgrade the kingdom of Alpoko with activities such as treasure hunting and fighting. Within a few hours, player is able to purchase and institute various buildings, training facilities, and other castle commodities, while the population steadily grows. All important stats such as population and finances are tracked constantly through an easily accessible menu system.

When walking around, Corobo is able to select any citizen to follow him. Afterward, the player is able to issue commands to each citizen, including actions such as digging and fighting. While the player can have a group of people follow him, he can only issue commands to one citizen at a time. Early in the game, the player has the option to buy a podium that allows the player to gather choice citizens without walking around and searching for them.

Corobo's followers are initially very limited and weak in capability; however, this is quickly corrected when training facilities are built. At that point, the player can send his citizens into the buildings and change them into a different type of worker. The game offers different jobs for civilians, including but not limited to soldier, carpenter, peasant, farmer, and hunter. Each job allows citizens different capabilities and weaknesses. For example, a farmer is exceptional at field work and digging, but is a poor fighter, while soldiers are strong but lack the ability to traverse environmental obstacles. Corobo is also able to converse with his followers whenever he desires, though it usually only produces small talk.

Outside of the main story, side quests are widely available via a suggestion box in the town square. Courtesy of varied civilian complaints, Corobo can accept missions that range from fetch quests to hunting and fighting that allow him to keep his public satisfied and increase finances. On some days, players are actually unable to do much due to events such as celebrations. After conquering a rival land, for example, the next day a massive parade is held in Alpoko. During this day, commanding people is a futile effort as they are too busy enjoying themselves. Saving progress can only be done in the kingdom.

Adventuring
Along with building and fortifying the kingdom, adventuring and questing constitutes the bulk of Little King's Story. Alpoko is only a small portion of the world, which the players must explore in order to advance the plot, collect valuable treasures and bounty, and conquer the seven rival kingdoms. It is here where having variously classed citizens comes in handy, as the player encounters various environmental obstacles, including things such as gaps in the land, caved in areas, and of course a wide slew of dangerous enemies, including boss battles.

Corobo attacks with his sceptre, but his attacks are extremely weak. Instead, he must have others do all fighting for him. All civilians and Corobo possess a set amount of life; should a civilian lose all of his he will die, while if the king dies it is game over. Scattered throughout the land are little hot springs that allow the player to replenish his life; however, in order to save and collect bounty, the player must travel back to Alpoko first.

Plot
Corobo is a lonely boy who enjoys playing with his toys in his dark and cluttered room. One day, while chasing out a group of rats, he wanders into a mysterious land and finds a crown. Upon putting it on, he discovers that the crown allows him to give people orders with which they cannot refuse. Corobo is also appointed the ruler of a little kingdom known as Alpoko, accompanied by Howser the Bull Knight, his friends, Liam and Verde (who become Minister of Anything and Record Keeper, respectively), and a slew of obedient citizens.

After building up Alpoko slightly, Corobo is issued a challenge by a foreign kingdom, which he defeats and conquers, gaining more money, territory, and a princess to keep and be with. Howser then encourages Corobo to unify the other six kingdoms under his reign. These kingdoms are ruled by kings which are: the evil Onii King (the one who issued the challenge in the first place and the leader of a group of demons called Oniis), the drunken King Duvroc (who uses his skill with liquor as a form of fighting), the obese King Shiskebaboo (who uses his obesity to fight back), the riddling Omelet King (a weakling that has his men do all the work while he cowers on his toilet), The TV-obsessed TV Dinnah, the tall Long Sauvage (who is, in reality, a pygmy), and the giant eraser man King Jumbo Champloon (the first man created by "God"). While doing this, the little king also meets Skinny Ray, a man who claims that the universe is coming to an end as evidenced by earthquakes of growing magnitude, though nobody listens to him. Eventually, Corobo unifies the whole world and gains an additional six princesses; however, as the quakes escalate to Armageddon scale, it is decided that the king must build a flying machine (which he does) and discover the cause of Armageddon. Right before, he discovers that his kingdom has gone bankrupt and that all of his princesses demand to come.

Upon choosing any one of the princesses or Verde (who also loves Corobo) to be with him, the king sets forth into space only to discover that his universe is contained within a box, and that its inhabitants are actually microscopic in size. It is then revealed that many of the characters are actually fantasy versions of people the owner of the box knows (Howser being a deceased grandfather turned into a knight and many of the bosses being parodies of various influences throughout this person's life). In fact, Little King's Story appears to be a child's diary acted out in the box. After facing a nasty group of rats, who are the cause of the tremors, little Corobo discovers himself to be alone while a giant boy awakens and chases him into a corner, only for a light to reveal that the giant is actually Corobo as he was at the beginning of the story. The game ends there without telling us whether the entire story was Corobo's dream or if there are two respective Corobos (a miniature king version and a regular boy version), as well as two different worlds.

Development
Little King's Story began development under the title "Project O". The game was executive produced by Yasuhiro Wada, who is the creator of the Story of Seasons series. Wada contracted a developer in Fukuoka to create a new title for the Wii and asked Yoshirou Kimura to sign on as a producer. As there was no other staff at that time, Kimura contacted Norikazu Yasunaga to aid in the game's design, Youichi Kawaguchi to direct and Hideo Minaba and Kazuyuki Kurashima to design the characters and monsters respectively.

Kimura had previously worked on cult titles such as Moon: Remix RPG Adventure and Chulip, and came up with the concept of Little King's Story. Kimura states that his inspiration for the game came from The Little Prince, a storybook he read as child. His goal the first year in development was to create a real-time strategy game with easy controls, specifically one that used the Wii Remote.

Little King's Story, as "Project O", was first shown at the Tokyo Game Show in 2007. The official website held a "UMA" (Unidentified Mysterious Animal) contest, where people were able to send a sketch of a monster they created. The first prize winner would have their "UMA" star as an in-game character, and 99 other winners would have the artwork displayed in the game. Six of the creatures that won were "Bruno", "Flummex", "Octoknight", "Pirabbit", "Ninjūn", and "Kabelle".

Rereleases

On August 24, 2011, it was announced that Marvelous Entertainment was working on a reimagining to Little King's Story titled  published by Konami for the PlayStation Vita. According to Famitsu, the game would have "love elements, along with new visual stylings for its characters."

In August 2016, Little King's Story was ported to PC via Steam by Marvelous, Inc. Although initially it had a mixed reception due to bugs and bad controls, after a major update, many of the complaints were fixed.

Audio
The game's music is composed and arranged by Yutaka Minobe. Yoko Shimomura, famous for her music in the Kingdom Hearts series, also contributed an arrangement of Boléro for the first trailer of the game, which debuted at Tokyo Game Show 2007. Sound and voice effects were handled by Vanpool.
The game's main background music comes from Beethoven's Symphony No. 9 in D minor, Opus 125, 4th movement from 9:00 to about 10:20.

Reception

Little King's Story received critical acclaim by many reviewers. It received 92% from Official Nintendo Magazine, a 9/10 in UK magazine Edge and an 8/10 from Eurogamer also Little King's Story . The game also won a Satellite Award for Outstanding Puzzle/Strategy Game.

As of November 13, 2009, Little King's Story had sold 26,000 units in Japan, 37,000 units in North America, and 67,000 units in Europe. Despite modest initial sales, Rising Star's Product Manager Yen Hau stated in 2010 that the title "is still selling well to this day, [which is] something [that] doesn't happen often to video games," citing Rising Star's satisfaction with sales. Kimura explained, "We are planning to make a sequel to Little King's Story, like Super Little King's Story, but we're still in the idea phase." However, Cing has declared bankruptcy since then; this does not mean studio closure, but rather that they will be tightening their financial belt. Regardless of Cing's closing, Marvelous Entertainment currently owns the full intellectual property rights to Little King's Story. Both Kimura and Wada left Marvelous and joined Grasshopper Manufacture in 2010.

Notes

References

External links
 Official North American website
 Official Japanese website 

2009 video games
Cing games
Construction and management simulation games
Fantasy video games
Konami games
Marvelous Entertainment
PlayStation Vita games
Role-playing video games
Wii games
Windows games
Real-time strategy video games
Life simulation games
Single-player video games
Rising Star Games games
Xseed Games games
Video games developed in Japan